Jihad ('striving' or 'struggling for something better or greater') is used as a given name.

People with the name Jihad or Jehad include:

Known name
 Abu Jihad, teknonym of Khalil al-Wazir, (1935–1988), Palestinian leader and founder of Fatah and top aide of Palestine Liberation Organization Chairman Yasser Arafat

Jihad
Jihad Al-Atrash (born 1943), Lebanese actor and voice actor
Jihad Azour, Lebanese (Christian) Minister of Finance
Jihad Benchlikha (born 1992), Moroccan basketball player
Jihad Ahmed Jibril (1961-2002), assassinated son of Ahmed Jibril, founder of the Popular Front for the Liberation of Palestine – General Command
Jihad Khodr (born 1983), Brazilian professional surfer
Jihad Makdissi, Foreign ministry spokesman of the Syrian government from 1998 to 2012
Jihad Mughniyah, Hezbollah Head of Security
Jihad Qassab (1975-2016), Syrian footballer
Jihad Ward (born 1994), American football player
Jihad Zoghbi, Syrian actor and voice actor

Jehad
 Jehad Al Baour (born 1987), Syrian footballer
 Jehad Al-Hussain (born 1982), Syrian footballer
 Jehad Muntasser (born 1978), Libyan footballer
 Jehad Al-Zowayed (born 1989), Saudi footballer
 Naziruddin Jehad (1969–1990), Bangladeshi political activist

Middle name
 Mohammad Jihad al-Laham, Syrian speaker of parliament

Arabic masculine given names